Provincial Ministers are appointed for each province of Zambia.

List of ministers

Central

Copperbelt

Eastern

Luapula

Lusaka

Muchinga

North-Western

Northern

Southern

Western

Deputy ministers

References

Government ministries of Zambia